The 2016 Kazakhstan Cup was the 25th season of the Kazakhstan Cup, the annual nationwide football cup competition of Kazakhstan since the independence of the country. The competition began on 21 March 2016 and end with the final on 19 November 2016. Astana defeated defending champions Kairat 1–0 in the final to win their first Kazakhstan Cup since 2012.

Ordabasy qualified for the first qualifying round of the 2017–18 UEFA Europa League after finishing 4th in the league, as both Astana and Kairat had already secured European football for the following season.

Participating clubs
The following 25 teams qualified for the competition:

Schedule
The rounds of the 2016 competition are scheduled as follows:
 Group Stages: 21–28 March 2016
 Last 16:
 Quarterfinal:
 Semifinal:
 Final:

Group stages

Group A

Group B

Group C

Last 16

Quarterfinal

Semifinals
The four winners from the quarterfinals were drawn into two two-legged ties.

Final

Scorers
3 goals:

 Junior Kabananga, Astana
 Đorđe Despotović, Astana
 Boško Stupić, Kyzylzhar

2 goals:

 Denis Kolodin, Altai Semey
 Tanat Nusserbayev, Astana
 Askhat Tagybergen, Astana
 Rustem Kuanyshev, Ekibastuz
 Arman Smailov, Irtysh Pavlodar
 Carlos Fonseca, Irtysh Pavlodar
 Islambek Kuat, Kairat
 Andrey Burtsev, Kyzylzhar
 Marat Khairullin, Okzhetpes

1 goals:

 Roger Cañas, Astana
 Serhiy Malyi, Astana
 Aleksandar Damčevski, Atyrau
 Volodymyr Arzhanov, Atyrau
 Erbolat Rustemov, Baikonur
 Alexander Fedorov, Bolat
 Konstantin Bernatskiy, Bolat
 Aset Uzganov, Caspiy
 Sanat Shalekenov, Caspiy
 Ignacio Herrera, Irtysh Pavlodar
 Baye Djiby Fall, Irtysh Pavlodar
 Roman Murtazayev, Irtysh Pavlodar
 Isael, Kairat
 Léandre Tawamba, Kairat
 Gerson Acevedo, Kairat
 Aslan Darabayev, Kairat
 Stanislav Lunin, Kairat
 Gafurzhan Suyumbayev, Kairat
 Andrey Arshavin, Kairat
 Elzhas Altynbekov, Kaisar
 Roman Pavinich, Kaisar
 Eugene Nokhrin, Kyran
 Timur Baizhanov, Kyzylzhar
 Evgeniy Averchenko, Kyzylzhar
 Sabyrhan Ibraev, Makhtaaral
 Rinat Abdulin, Ordabasy
 Daurenbek Tazhimbetov, Ordabasy
 Erkebulan Tungyshbaev, Ordabasy
 Daniil Chertov, Okzhetpes
 Alisher Suley, Taraz
 Dušan Savić, Zhetysu

Own goal

 Marko Đalović (25 May 2016 vs Kairat)

References

External links 
 

2016
Cup
2016 domestic association football cups